Jushay Rockett (born February 4, 1984) is an American professional basketball player who last played for the Mississauga Power of the National Basketball League of Canada (NBL).

References

External links 
Jushay Rockett at RealGM
Alaska bio

Living people
1984 births
American men's basketball players
Arizona Western Matadors men's basketball players
Texas State Bobcats men's basketball players
University of Alaska Fairbanks alumni
Basketball players from Long Beach, California
Forwards (basketball)
Mississauga Power players